Rival was a sternwheel steamboat that ran on the Willamette River between Oregon City and Portland, Oregon from 1860 to 1868.  Rival was intended to be  a boat which would promise low fares in an effort to beat a steamboat monopoly which was then in formation.

Construction and initial ownership 
Rival was built at Oregon City, Oregon by William and John Dement, two brothers who were merchants in Oregon City, and Capt. George A. Pease, who became her first captain.  There had been a tendency towards steamboat monopolies on the Oregon Rivers in the later 1850s, and the Dement brothers intended  Rival as her name suggested, was built to challenge the powerful People's Navigation Company which dominated Willamette River traffic.  When launched, Rival was first put on the run from Oregon City to Portland, Oregon.  Her announced fares were $2 per ton for freight and 50 cents per head for passengers between terminal points.  They were also willing to negotiate long-term contracts.

Operations 

There was a major flood of the Willamette River in late November and early December 1861. On November 30, the Rival tried to make her regular run from Oregon City to Portland, but was forced to abandon it after going only a few miles. Above Willamette Falls on the same day the steamer Onward started down the river towards Salem, under George Pease, who had sold his interest in Rival  to Capt. John T. Apperson, two months after Rivals completion, was now in command of Onward, and what started as a commercial venture that day for Onward turned into one of rescue, as the flood had carried away houses which were floating in the river with their occupants on the roofs.

Ownership changes
Capt. J. T. Apperson having purchased the shares of George Pease in Rival, in turn sold his interest to the People's Transportation Company.  The Dements, having failed to break the monopoly, also sold out to Peoples in 1862.  Professor Mills as well as the major 19th century work on the topic, both state that Rival was part of the Oregon Steam Navigation Company by 1862, and in that year was turned over to Peoples' in 1862 as part of an anticompetitive agreement between People's and OSN, whereby OSN would stay off the Willamette River, and pay a subsidy to Peoples if People's stayed off the Columbia.  While in the service of the People's Transportation Company, Rival was in command of Capt. Ephraim W. Baughman most of the time, and during her last days was used as a spare boat, to take the place of the Senator on the Oregon City route.

Disposition 
Rival was dismantled in 1868 at Portland.

Notes

References 
 Affleck, Edward L., A Century of Paddlewheelers in the Pacific Northwest, the Yukon, and Alaska, Alexander Nicolls Press, Vancouver, BC 2000 
 Corning, Howard McKinley, Willamette Landings—Ghost Towns of the River, Oregon Historical Society, Portland, Oregon (2nd Ed. 1973) 
 Mills, Randall V., Sternwheelers up the Columbia—A Century of Steamboating in the Oregon Country, University of Nebraska, Lincoln, NE (1977 reprint of 1947 edition) 
 Timmen, Fritz, Blow for the Landing—A Hundred Years of Steam Navigation on the Waters of the West, Caxton Press, Caldwell, ID 1973 
 Wright, E.W., ed., Lewis & Dryden 's Marine History of the Northwest, Lewis & Dryden Printing Co., Portland, OR 1895, available on-line at the Washington Secretary of State Historical Section

Further reading
 Faber, Jim, Steamer's Wake—Voyaging down the old marine highways of Puget Sound, British Columbia, and the Columbia River, Enetai Press, Seattle, WA 1985 
 Newell, Gordon R., and Williamson, Joe, Pacific Steamboats Bonanza Press, New York, NY 1958

Steamboats of Oregon
Steamboats of the Willamette River
Passenger ships of the United States
Merchant ships of the United States
Oregon Steam Navigation Company
People's Transportation Company